William J. Borcher (July 12, 1919 – April 6, 2003) was an American basketball coach, the head coach at the University of Oregon from 1951 to 1956.

Early years
Born in International Falls, Minnesota, he attended North Bend High School in North Bend, Oregon, where he played both football and basketball. After graduation in 1937, he played basketball for Sacramento Junior College in California, then transferred up to Eugene and played for two seasons at Oregon under head coach Howard Hobson, At  he was a forward and center, and also a played a season of football in 1941 at end. During World War II, Borcher served in the U.S. Navy from 1942 to 1945.

Head coach
From 1945 to 1951, Borcher was the head basketball coach at Marshfield High School in Coos Bay. His 1947 team won the state championship and that year he founded the Oregon Jazz Band. After six seasons at Marshfield, Borcher moved up to the collegiate level in 1951 as the head coach at Oregon. He compiled a 69–68 record in five seasons, and resigned in March 1956. He was succeeded by Steve Belko, who remained for fifteen seasons.

Jazz festival
An accomplished musician, he excelled on the coronet, and played the drums and bass fiddle as well. After coaching, he continued with the Oregon Jazz Band. He gained his doctorate in education from Oregon in 1964 and then worked in administration at American River JC in Sacramento. In 1972, Borcher founded the Sacramento Jazz Jubilee, which is the largest jazz festival in the world. He was inducted into the North Bend High School hall of fame in 2001, and posthumously into Marshfield's in 2003.

Head coaching record

College

References

External links
 Sports-Reference.com – William Borcher

1919 births
2003 deaths
American football ends
American men's basketball players
Basketball coaches from Oregon
Basketball players from Oregon
Centers (basketball)
Dixieland jazz musicians
Forwards (basketball)
High school basketball coaches in Oregon
Jacksonville Naval Air Station Flyers football players
Junior college men's basketball players in the United States
Oregon Ducks football players
Oregon Ducks men's basketball coaches
Oregon Ducks men's basketball players
People from International Falls, Minnesota
People from North Bend, Oregon
Players of American football from Oregon
Sacramento City College alumni